Retinyl acetate (retinol acetate, vitamin A acetate) is a natural form of vitamin A which is the acetate ester of retinol.  It has potential antineoplastic and chemopreventive activities.

In the United States, retinyl acetate is classified generally recognized as safe (GRAS) in the amounts used to fortify foods with vitamin A.

Toxicology

World Health Organization recommendation on Maternal Supplementation During Pregnancy states that "health benefits are expected for the mother and her developing fetus with little risk of detriment to either, from a daily supplement not exceeding 10,000 IU vitamin A (3000mcg RE) at any time during pregnancy." Preformed Vitamin A refers to retinyl palmitate and retinyl acetate.

References

Vitamins
Acetate esters
Cyclohexenes